is a town located in Fukushima Prefecture, Japan. , the town had an estimated population of 12,272 in 4434 households, and a population density of 390 persons per km². The total area of the town was ..

Geography
Kagamiishi is located on a  plateau with an average elevation of 280 meters in south-central Fukushima prefecture, bordered by the Shakado River to the west and the Abukuma River to the east.

Neighboring municipalities
 Fukushima Prefecture
 Ten'ei
 Sukagawa
 Yabuki
Tamakawa

Climate
Kagamiishi has a humid climate (Köppen climate classification Cfa).

Demographics
Per Japanese census data, the population of Kagamiishi has plateaued after a long period of growth.

History
The area of present-day Kagamiishi was part of ancient Mutsu Province and formed part of the holdings of Shirakawa Domain during the Edo period. After the Meiji Restoration, it was organized as part of Iwase District in the Nakadōri region of Iwashiro Province. Kagamiishi Village was formed on April 1, 1889 with the creation of the modern municipalities system. It was elevated to town status on August 1, 1962. During the 2011 Tohoku earthquake, over 1000 structures were severely damaged or destroyed, corresponding to approximately 23 percent of the town,

Economy
The economy of Kagamiishi is primarily agricultural.

Education
Kagamiishi has two public elementary schools and one public junior high school operated by the town government. The town has one public high school operated by the Fukushima Prefectural Board of Education.
 Kagamiishi Middle School
 Fukushima Prefectural Iwase Agricultural High School

Transportation

Railway
 JR East – Tōhoku Main Line

Highway
  Tōhoku Expressway

Local attractions
 Iwase Farm

References

External links

 

 
Towns in Fukushima Prefecture